"Joke Over" is the thirteenth episode of the fifth and final series of the period drama Upstairs, Downstairs. It first aired on 30 November 1975 on ITV.

Background
Joke Over was recorded in the studio on 29 and 30 May 1975. The location footage was filmed near Middle Wallop in Andover, Hampshire on 21 May 1975. The scavenger hunt plotline was inspired by the autobiography of Barbara Cartland, We Danced All Night. This had also been used by Rosemary Anne Sisson in the earlier episode Laugh a Little Louder Please. In Joke Over, Madeleine Cannon makes her final appearance as Lady Dolly Hale.

Cast
Lesley-Anne Down - Georgina Worsley
Gordon Jackson - Hudson
David Langton - Richard Bellamy
Hannah Gordon - Virginia Bellamy
Angela Baddeley - Mrs Bridges
Raymond Huntley - Sir Geoffrey Dillon
Christopher Beeny - Edward
Nigel Havers - Peter Dinmont
Patsy Blower - Ethel
Madeline Cannon - Lady Dolly Hale
Terence Bayler - Darrow Morton
Anthony Andrews - Robert, Marquis of Stockbridge
Jacqueline Tong - Daisy
Barry Stanton - PC Burridge
Bernard Barnsley - Mr Smith
Jenny Tomasin - Ruby
Robert Hartley - Coroner
Daphne Lawson - Mrs Smith
Kenneth Thornett - Foreman of the Jury
Sue Crossland - Double for Lesley-Anne Down

Plot
It is summer 1928, and Lord and Lady Bellamy are in Wiltshire, so Georgina has the house to herself. She returns late at night with friends Lady Dolly, Peter Dinmont, Ethel, Darrow Morton and Lord Stockbridge after a scavenger hunt. The final item for the scavenger hunt is a maid's cap, which they fetch from the Servants' Quarters, waking Hudson in the process. Lady Dolly soon goes upstairs to take cocaine. To finish the scavenger hunt the party need to drive down to the country, but when Lady Dolly's car has a puncture, they go to the garage and insist on taking Lord Bellamy's car. Edward tries to insist he drives, but they ignore him and go alone.

Georgina is driving on a quiet road in Sussex when a cyclist, Mr Smith, suddenly comes out in front of her. Despite braking, she runs the man over. Back in London, Lord and Lady Bellamy return and Sir Geoffrey Dillon arrives and informs them that Mr Smith has died. Richard blames Edward for allowing Georgina to drive. Lord Stockbridge's father, the Duke of Buckminster, forbids Robert, who was travelling in a separate car behind Georgina, from attending the inquest and the solicitors have arranged to say that he was not there. At the inquest, Darrow, Peter and Ethel do not turn up, and Lady Dolly's testimony does more to harm Georgina's case than help. At the last minute, Lord Stockbridge turns up and insists on giving evidence. He tells the inquest how Georgina was only driving at 30 mph and says she could not have done anything to avoid running over Mr Smith. The verdict is given as "accidental death" but Georgina is rebuked for "irresponsible behaviour".

Meanwhile, Edward is annoyed at being blamed for the event, and tells Daisy he will resign. However, Richard soon speaks to him and apologizes, saying Georgina told him what happened. Georgina tells Lord Stockbridge after the inquest that she never wants to see Lady Dolly again and they then go to the Savoy Grill together.

Footnotes

References
Richard Marson, "Inside UpDown - The Story of Upstairs, Downstairs", Kaleidoscope Publishing, 2005
Updown.org.uk - Upstairs, Downstairs Fansite

Upstairs, Downstairs (series 5) episodes
1975 British television episodes
Fiction set in 1928